The Garrard Engineering and Manufacturing Company of Swindon, Wiltshire, was a British company that was famous for producing high-quality gramophone turntables. It was formed by the jewellers Garrard & Co in 1915. The company was sold to Plessey, an electronics conglomerate, in 1960. During the period 1976-1978, Garrard developed demonstrators of the novel video disc technology. Although the team recognised the future potential of this data storage technology, Plessey chose not to invest. After several years in decline, Garrard was sold by Plessey to Gradiente Electronics of Brazil in 1979 and series production was moved to Brazil (Manaus). The remaining Garrard research and development operation in Swindon was reduced to a skeleton operation until completely shut down in 1992. Then, Gradiente licensed the Garrard name to Terence O'Sullivan, who operated as Loricraft Audio, in 1997.

Between 1992 and 1997, the Garrard brand name was licensed to other companies in the US, which imported electronic items built by different, unrelated Far Eastern manufacturers. These included "Garrard" branded cassette decks, CD players, stereo receivers, portable radio/cassette players, portable "Walkman" type cassette players, serial-port printer cables, universal TV/audio remote controls, and other miscellany, including turntables that had no connection with any original Garrard design.

In 2018, Cadence Audio SA, who also own the British turntable and tonearm manufacturer SME Limited, took ownership of the Garrard brand and registered trademarks when they purchased Loricraft Audio Ltd. The business was restructured to run under the name of Garrard Turntables UK Ltd.

The Garrard 301 and 401 Transcription Turntables

The Garrard 301 Transcription Turntable was the first transcription turntable that supported all extant commercial playback formats – the 33, 45 and 78 rpm records of the time. The first model was the Garrard 301. Oil and grease bearing versions were made. The later 401 was nearly identical mechanically, but with a redesigned exterior, more powerful motor, slightly different eddy current braking speed control and different turntable thrust bearing.  Both models were used by the BBC and in commercial radio stations, mostly in Europe. The 301 and to a lesser extent the 401 were also exported. Production of the 301 started in 1953 and sales were launched in 1954. The 401 was introduced in 1965 and produced until 1976.

See also 

 List of phonograph manufacturers
 Record changer

References

Boardman, Haden (1994). "Turning The Tables: Garrard Model 301 and 401 Transcription Motor Units ", Sound Practices.
Kessler, Ken (2005). "Table Talk", Garrard 301/401, Hifi News & Record Review.
Mortimer, E.W. (1967). "Design Of Transcription Turntables", Component Technology, Plessey Group.
Olson, Lynn (2005). "A Tiny History of High Fidelity", The Soul Of Sound.

External links

History of the company 
Garrard in Swindon
 E.W. Mortimer, Transcription Turntable Design article. 
 Lynn Olson, Tiny History Of High Fidelity article, part one.
 Lynn Olson, Tiny History Of High Fidelity article, part two.
 Garrard History article, Swindon Web.

Audio equipment manufacturers of the United Kingdom
Defunct manufacturing companies of the United Kingdom
Phonograph manufacturers
Plessey
DJ equipment